Aleksandr Ivanovich Gamanenko (8 January 1937 – 22 November 2022) was a Russian agronomist and politician. A member of the Communist Party of the Russian Federation, he served in the State Duma from 1999 to 2003.

Gamanenko died in Kalininskaya on 22 November 2022 at the age of 85.

References

1937 births
2022 deaths
Third convocation members of the State Duma (Russian Federation)
Recipients of the Order of the Red Banner of Labour
Communist Party of the Russian Federation members